The Little River is a  inlet of the Atlantic Ocean in southern Maine in the United States. It is formed by the juncture of the Merriland River and Branch Brook, and its course serves as the boundary between the towns of Kennebunk and Wells.

See also
 List of rivers of Maine

References

 
 Maine Streamflow Data from the USGS
 Maine Watershed Data From Environmental Protection Agency

Rivers of Maine
Rivers of Oxford County, Maine
Rivers of York County, Maine